Cinkotai Royal Ground is a multi-purpose recreational facility in Budapest, Hungary. It is used for sports matches as well other events such as music concerts. The facility serves as the home ground of Budapest rugby club Medvék RK.

History
The ground opened in 1994.

Sports venues in Budapest